Gekko kuhli, commonly known as Kuhl's flying gecko, Kuhl's parachute gecko, or the gliding gecko, is a species of lizard in the family Gekkonidae. The species is found in Southeast Asia.

Etymology
The specific name, kuhli, is in honor of German zoologist Heinrich Kuhl.

Description

G. kuhli has adaptations to its skin, including flaps on either side of its body, webbed feet, and a flattened tail to allow it to glide over short distances.  This gecko has a remarkable camouflage.  The flaps of skin along its sides help it blend with tree bark.  Often, its eyes are the only way to distinguish it from its surroundings. This use of camouflage by G. kuhli has caused need for some other adaptions to protect it from the increased UV exposure. Despite being nocturnal, they are considered heliothermic because of the extended sun exposure they receive while resting during the day. This increased UV exposure has led to the adaption of pigmented internal organs to protect the lizards more important organs from UV damage.

Kuhl's flying gecko, like many other gecko species, has evolved intricate toe pads with microscopic hairs that can adhere to nearly any surface, including glass.

Geographic range
G. kuhli is found in the Malay Peninsula (southern Thailand, Malaysia, Singapore) and many adjacent islands and in the Greater Sunda Islands, including the larger islands (Sumatra, Java, Borneo, and Sulawesi) and many smaller ones. Its presence in Myanmar and the Nicobar Islands (India) is unconfirmed.

As a pet

The common flying gecko requires, among other things, a terrarium of at least 20 gallons (57–76 litres), preferably tall rather than long, and careful handling. It should be handled as little as possible, due to possible damage to its skin.

References

Further reading
Brown, Rafe M.; Ferner, John W.; Diesmos, Arvin C. (1997). "Definition of the Philippine Parachute Gecko, Ptychozoon intermedium Taylor 1915 (Reptilia: Squamata: Gekkonidae): Redescription, designation of a neotype, and comparisons with related species". Herpetologica 53 (3): 357–373.
Brown, Rafe M. (1999). "New species of parachute gecko (Squamata: Gekkonidae: genus Ptychozoon) from northeastern Thailand and central Vietnam". Copeia 1999 (4): 990–1001.
Mertens, Robert; Senfft, Walter (1929). "Aus dem Leben des Faltengeckos (Ptychozoon kuhli Stejneger)". Natur und Museum 59 (4): 218–224. (in German).
Stejneger L (1902). "Ptychozoon kuhli, a new name for P. homalocephalum ". Proc. Biol. Soc. Washington 15: 37.
Griffing, A. H., Gamble, T., & Bauer, A. M. (2020). Distinct patterns of pigment development underlie convergent hyperpigmentation between nocturnal and diurnal geckos (squamata: gekkota). Bmc Evolutionary Biology, 20(1). https://doi.org/10.1186/s12862-020-01604-9

External links

Gekko
Lizards of Asia
Fauna of Southeast Asia
Reptiles of Borneo
Reptiles of Brunei
Reptiles of India
Geckos of Indonesia
Geckos of Malaysia
Reptiles of Singapore
Geckos of Thailand
Taxa named by Leonhard Stejneger
Reptiles described in 1902
Gliding animals